John Bernard Derum  (born 9 January 1946) is an Australian stage, film and television actor. He has also directed and produced for theatre companies throughout Australia and for television.

Career

Theatre 

Derum walked in on Wal Cherry's Emerald Hill Theatre a mere seventeen years old in late 1963 and was cast by George Whaley in his production Billy Liar. Within six months he was working as a supporting actor beside Keith Michell and Googie Withers in the nationwide tour of a Shakespearean celebration, The First Four Hundred Years. The young actor continued to work and mature and was to play roles including Kostya in The Seagull (Adelaide Festival 1970), Peer Gynt (Sydney Opera House 1975), Mr Mantelini and others in Nicholas Nickleby (Sydney Theatre Company 1983-85), Reverend Parris in The Crucible (Sydney Theatre Company 1991-93) and numerous revues, musicals and variety performances.

John Derum was Artistic Director of the Canberra Company, Theatre ACT in 1985–86. He was awarded a Literary Fellowship at the Australian Defence Force Academy in 1990, which enabled the publication of the expanded script of More Than A Sentimental Bloke.

Between 1996 and 1999 Derum was the General Manager of the Independent Theatre in North Sydney, charged with overseeing the completion of the restoration and the successful re-opening of that historic theatre.

Since his return from the Blue Mountains to Sydney in 2007, he has resumed his career as actor and director. He has directed more than a dozen rehearsed readings of new scripts and directed Waiting For Gotterson by Sam Atwell for original and return seasons at Newtown Theatre in 2008, and Housebound (Crime Scenes 2009). He played Lord Augustus in Oscar Wilde's Lady Windermere's Fan (Darlinghurst Theatre, 2009), Aidan Turner and David Marsh in David Hare's The Power of Yes (Belvoir 2010), and he continues to record a wide range of voice tracks and readings for radio.

Television 

Derum first appeared on Australian television in the first episode of Homicide in 1964, a serious role as the delinquent son of a bank security guard. Later he appeared in another Australian police drama Division 4. He became famous for his appearances as Narrator Neville in the first season of the ABC's irreverent satire/comedy The Aunty Jack Show. Derum appeared in a number of comedy and revue series including The Thursday Creek Mob (1969–70), The True Blue Show (1975), Doctor Down Under (1979) as "Doctor Maurice Griffin", and Ratbags (1982). He appeared in the final edition of The Mavis Bramston Show in 1975.

He played B. A. Santamaria in the ABC miniseries True Believers (1987) and Francis James in The Gadfly (1990) and appeared in G.P. and Mother and Son in the 1990s.

For ABC Television, he hosted more than 200 editions of the national quiz The Oz Game and more than 50 episodes of the Australian music and folklore program That's Australia.

Derum also lent his voice to the ABC children's animated television series The Adventures of Sam.

Narrator 
He narrated the audio-book Sanctuary by Judy Nunn.

Film 

His film appearances include Mad Dog Morgan, The Trespassers (1976; as Richard), Kazzam International, and The Night the Prowler (1978; as John).

John Derum has become widely identified with his interpretation of the work of Australian writers, particularly C. J. Dennis. He performed More Than A Sentimental Bloke, his tribute to Dennis, more than 500 times around Australia between 1979 and 1994. He has also recorded and performed The Songs of a Sentimental Bloke and the Dennis masterpiece The Glugs of Gosh.

Politics 

Derum was elected to Blue Mountains City Council from 1995 to 1999 and worked as a political adviser between 2001 and 2007. He was appointed to the Theatre Committee of the NSW Government Arts Advisory Board, and worked on the staff of the NSW Minister for the Environment and Attorney-General and as electorate advisor for three members of parliament. He has twice held office in Actors Equity and he founded the actors' support group, Actors Forum.

Awards

Derum was made a member of the Order of Australia (AM) on 26 January 2019 for significant service to the performing arts as an actor, director and administrator, and to the community.

References

External links
 
 , AusStage, Australian Live Performance Database 
 John Derum as CJ Dennis' "Sentimental Bloke" in 1990 at middlemiss.org

1946 births
Living people
Australian male film actors
Australian male television actors
Australian male stage actors
Australian people of Scottish descent
Members of the Order of Australia